Fukatsu is a Japanese surname. Notable people with the surname include:

, Japanese volleyball player
, Japanese actress
, Japanese volleyball player
, Japanese footballer
, Japanese tennis table player
, Japanese long-distance runner

Japanese-language surnames